The coat of arms of Lesotho was adopted on 4 October 2006, after Lesotho's 40th anniversary of independence. Pictured is a crocodile on a Basotho shield.  This is the symbol of the dynasty of Lesotho's largest ethnicity, the Bakoena.  Behind the shield there are two crossed weapons, an assegai (lance) and a knobkierie (club).  To the left and right of the shield are supporters of the shield, two Basutho horses.  In the foreground there is a ribbon with the national motto of Lesotho: Khotso, Pula, Nala (Sesotho, to English: Peace, Rain, Prosperity). The crocodile on the shield has been retained from the arms of Basutoland, the predecessor to Lesotho.

See also
Flag of Lesotho

External links
Flags of the World - Lesotho: Coats of Arms

National symbols of Lesotho
Lesotho
Lesotho
Lesotho
Lesotho